This is a list of adaptive radiated marsupials by form; they are adaptively radiated marsupial species equivalent to the many niche-types of non-marsupial mammals. Many of the surviving species are from Australia. There are unique types, for example the extinct genus Nototherium, a 'rhinoceros-type'.

The new world has the common opossum, also a unique form.

Even before the mid-19th century and Charles Darwin's time, biogeographers understood speciation and animal niches. A supreme example that became known to Darwin as sailing ships traveled the world is the New Zealand flightless, ground-dwelling, worm-eating kiwi, a bird, but a species in a mammal-niche.

Anteater-like
1 genus–(monotypic)(2 subspecies)

Cat-like
1 genus–(6 species)

Groundhog-like
6 genera2 surviving genera

Mole-like
1 genus–(2 species)

Rhinoceros-like
1 genus

Panther-like
6 genera

Flying Squirrel-like
1 genus–(6 species)

Canine-like
1 genus–(1 species)

Hyena-like
1 genus–(1 species)

Deer-like

 - Family Macropodidae

Unique: opossum-like
? species

See also

Marsupial
Island ecology
Biogeography

References

Wilson, Eisner, Briggs, Dickerson, Metzenberg, O'Brien, Susman, & Boggs. Life on Earth, Edward O. Wilson, Thomas Eisner, Winslow R. Briggs, Richard E. Dickerson, Robert L. Metzenberg, Richard D. O'Brien, Millard Susman, William E. Boggs, c 1973, Sinauer Associates, Inc., Publisher, Stamford, Connecticut. 1033 pp, 19 p Index & Back Page (hardcover)

Natural history of Australia

Speciation